= Flockland Island Crisis =

1982 video game

- Developers: Kevin Bagley, Roland Love, Garald Van Viver
- Publisher: Vital Information, Inc
- Platform: Apple II
- Release: 1982

Flockland Island Crisis is a 1982 video game published by Vital Information, Inc.

== Gameplay ==
Flockland Island Crisis is a game in which the player defends an island from attackers on both sides of the island.

== Reception ==
Stuart Gorrie reviewed the game for Computer Gaming World, and stated that "all factors considered, if you enjoy demanding hand/eye coordination arcade games, then you will enjoy Flockland Island Crisis."

The game sold 1,200 copies.
